For the Summer Olympics, there are 60 venues that have been or will be used for athletics. These venues have been the main stadium that has also served as host for both the opening and closing ceremonies of the Summer Olympics, with a notable exception being the Estádio Olímpico João Havelange, who hosted athletics events at Rio 2016; the ceremonies were hosted in the Maracanã.

Other uses for the stadiums have included the FIFA World Cup, the Major League Baseball All-Star Game, the World Series, the National Football League's Super Bowl, the Asian Games, the Pan American Games (North and South America), and the IAAF World Championships in Athletics.

For the FIFA World Cup, the athletic stadiums of 1908 (1966), 1924 (1938 final), 1936 (1974, 2006 final), 1948 (1966 final), 1960 (1990 final), 1968 (1986), 1972 (1974 final), and 1980 (2018) hosted the final match.

As of 2019, seven of the athletic stadiums have played host to seven IAAF World Championships in Athletics. They are from 1936 (2009), 1952 (1983, 2005), 1960 (1987), 1964 (1991), 1980 (2013), 2004 (1997), 2008 (2015), and 2012 (2017). 

Two athletic stadiums used for the Summer Olympics have hosted the Asian Games. They are 1964 (1958) and 1988 (1986). Two other stadiums played host to the Pan American Games were from 1968 (1955) and 2016 (2007).

Three athletic venues hosted the Major League Baseball All-Star Game with the stadium for 1932 and 1984 hosting the second 1959 game, the 1976 venue hosting in 1982, and the 1996 venue (reconfigured as Turner Field after the 1996 Games) in 2000. The World Series would be hosted at the 1932 and 1984 athletics Summer Olympics in 1959 while the 1996 athletics venue would host forty years later. The 1976 athletics venue hosted the Canadian Football League Grey Cup six times between 1977 and 2008. Finally, the athletics venues used for the 1932 and 1984 Summer Olympics played host to the National Football League's Super Bowl's I and VII.

References

Venues
 
Athletics
Olympic venues in athletics
Olympic venues